Jesse R. Vanderwende is an American politician. He is a Republican member of the Delaware House of Representatives, representing District 35. In 2018, Vanderwende was elected after winning the Republican primary with nearly 60 percent of the vote. He was unopposed in the general election.

References

External links
Official page at the Delaware General Assembly
Campaign site
 

Living people
People from Bridgeville, Delaware
Democratic Party members of the Delaware House of Representatives
21st-century American politicians
Year of birth missing (living people)